Dewey Wade was an NCAA football player and coach, and a player for the National Football League's San Francisco 49ers born in St. Joseph, Missouri.

Biography
Wade went to school at Omaha North High School, where he was on the state football champion team in 1948, and the city champion football teams of 1949 and 1950. In 1950, he won the honors of joining the All-City and All-State teams, as well as lettering in football, wrestling, basketball and track.

Later that year Wade began college at Kansas State University, where he played for the Wildcats. He scored first Big Seven touchdown versus the University of Missouri in 1950 and led the team in rushing yardage versus Kansas as well. He also rushed for 79 yards and six first downs versus Nebraska. Wade left college to play football for the United States Marine Corps football team. He was named to the "second-team" for the 1954 All-Service Team.

In 1955 Wade was drafted by the San Francisco 49ers. He played for the Houston Cougars in 1957 and 1958, and graduated from University of Houston in 1959.

Coaching
Wade became a coach with Dick Offenheimer for the University at Buffalo in 1960 and stayed there through 1965. In 1966, he went to the University of Maryland with head coach Lou Saban, and in 1969 he began coaching at Utah State University with Chuck Mills, staying there until 1971.

In 1972 Wade began coaching with Vince Gibson at his alma mater of Kansas State University.

Wade also had stints coaching professionally with the Omaha Mustangs in 1967, 1968 and the Edmonton Eskimos in 1970.

Wade was a National Football League scout for several teams, including the Baltimore Colts, the Pittsburgh Steelers and the Dallas Cowboys.

Playing History, Accolades

High school

Omaha North High School Vikings
1950 Omaha City Champions
1949 Omaha City Champions
1948 Omaha City and Nebraska State Champions

1950 All City Omaha, All State Football, Individual Honors

Letters: Football, Wrestling, Basketball, Track

College

Kansas State University 1950, 1951    (Wildcats in the NFL)

Scored first Big Seven touchdown versus Missouri 1950
Led Team in rushing yardage versus Kansas 1950
Rushed for  xx Yards and x First Downs versus Nebraska

United States Marine Corps Football Team

Named "Second-team"  All Service 1954

College All Star:  Hula Bowl 1955 w/ NFL Cleveland Browns

Hula Bowl 1956 w/ NFL San Francisco 49ers

National Football League

Drafted by the San Francisco 49ers 1956

Houston Cougars 1957, 1958    Graduate 1959

NCAA Coaching Experience

University at Buffalo   1960, 1961, 1962, 1963, 1964, 1965
Notable players; Gerry Philbin, John Stofa, John Cimba, Jim McNally, Mike Mazer, Gerry LaFountain, Jim Ratel, Don Gilbert
University of Maryland 1966
Notable players:
Utah State University   1969, 1970, 1971
Notable players: Tony Adams, Bill Dunstan, Tom Forzani, Kent Baer
Kansas State University 1972
Notable players: Steve Grogan

Professional Coaching Experience

Omaha Mustangs 1967, 1968    Continental Football League
Notable Players: Frank Solich
Edmonton Eskimos   1971     Canadian Football League

National Football League Scouting Roles 

Baltimore Colts
Pittsburgh Steelers
Dallas Cowboys

Wade associations in the coaching ranks included Paul Bear Bryant, Woody Hayes, George Steinbrenner, Chuck Mills, Homer Smith, Walt Corey, Buddy Ryan, Vince Gibson, Don Powell, Frank Falks, Ray Jaunck, Lou Saban, Steve Bernstein, Cliff Yoshada,

References
 Kansas State University Media Guide 1951, 1952, 1953
 Utah State University Media Guide 1970, 1971
 San Francisco Chronicle, Sporting Green, August 19, 1956
 San Francisco 49ers Game program; SF-Cleveland Browns 1956
 American Football Coaches Association: All Time Hula Bowl Roster, 1955, 1956
 NFL Draft Data Base SF 49ers
 K-State Wildcat Football, Wildcats in the NFL
 San Francisco 49ers DraftHistory.com
 University of Houston Lettermen Association
 Hall Of Fame: DEWEY WADE

Houston Cougars football players
San Francisco 49ers players
Sportspeople from Omaha, Nebraska
Utah State Aggies football coaches
Kansas State University alumni
Omaha North High School alumni
Kansas State Wildcats football players
1931 births
2012 deaths